Moca albodiscata is a moth in the family Immidae. It was described by Francis Walker in 1863. It is found in Tefé, Brazil.

Adults are blackish brown, silvery white beneath. The thorax has a testaceous stripe on each side. The forewings have a whitish-testaceous tinged and slightly hyaline disk and there is a cinereous diffuse and interrupted submarginal band. The marginal points are black and the costa is mostly cinereous.

References

Moths described in 1863
Immidae
Moths of South America